Johannes ("Han") Nicolaas Maria Kulker (born 15 August 1959 in Leidschendam, South Holland) is a former Dutch middle distance runner, who won a bronze medal at the 1986 European Championships in Athletics in Stuttgart over 1500 metres. The race was won by Steve Cram.

Two years later, Kulker finished sixth in the 1500 m final of the 1988 Summer Olympics in Seoul, where Peter Rono won gold. In 1987 Kulker won the bronze medal at the World Indoor Championships in Athletics over 1500 metres.

International competitions

External links

1959 births
Living people
Dutch male middle-distance runners
Athletes (track and field) at the 1988 Summer Olympics
European Athletics Championships medalists
Olympic athletes of the Netherlands
World Athletics Championships athletes for the Netherlands
People from Leidschendam
World Athletics Indoor Championships medalists
Sportspeople from South Holland
20th-century Dutch people